Cameraria acericola is a moth of the family Gracillariidae. It is known from Japan (Hokkaido) and the Russian Far East.

The wingspan is 6.5–8.5 mm.

The larvae feed as leaf miners on Acer mono. The mine consists of a blotch which is entirely flat and located on the upper surface of the leaf. The cocoon is buff white, ellipsoidal and placed in the centre of the mine-cavity.

References

Cameraria (moth)
Moths of Japan

Moths described in 1963
Leaf miners
Taxa named by Tosio Kumata